Isokon Flats, also known as Lawn Road Flats and the Isokon building, on Lawn Road in the Belsize Park district of the London Borough of Camden, is a reinforced concrete block of 36 flats (originally 32), designed by Canadian engineer Wells Coates for Molly and Jack Pritchard.

Pre-war years 
The designs for the flats were developed between 1929–1932 and opened on 9 July 1934 as an experiment in minimalist urban living. All of the "Existenzminimum" flats had very small kitchens as there was a communal kitchen for the preparation of meals, connected to the residential floors via a dumb waiter. Services, including laundry and shoe-polishing, were provided on site.

The building originally included 24 studio flats, eight one-bedroom flats, staff quarters, a kitchen and a large garage. The Pritchards lived in a one-bedroom penthouse flat at the top with their two sons Jeremy and Jonathan next door in a studio flat. Plywood was used extensively in the fittings of the apartments; Jack Pritchard was the Marketing Manager for the Estonian plywood company Venesta between 1926 and 1936, while he also operated the Isokon Furniture Company, originally in partnership with Wells Coates.

Celebrated residents included: Bauhaus émigrés Walter Gropius, Marcel Breuer, and László Moholy-Nagy; architects Egon Riss and Arthur Korn;  Agatha Christie (between 1941 and 1947) and her husband Max Mallowan, art historian Adrian Stokes, the author Nicholas Monsarrat, the archaeologist V. Gordon Childe, modernist architect Jacques Groag and his wife textile designer Jacqueline Groag. The communal kitchen was converted into the Isobar restaurant in 1937, to a design by Marcel Breuer and F.R.S. Yorke. The flats and particularly the Isobar became renowned as a centre for socialist intellectual and artistic life in Hampstead and regular visitors to the Isobar included nearby residents Henry Moore, Barbara Hepworth and Ben Nicholson.

Espionage
A number of Isokon residents were later identified as Soviet agents and in the 1930s and Cold War period the building was subject to surveillance by the British security services In the mid-1930s Flat 7 was occupied by Dr Arnold Deutsch, the NKVD agent who recruited the Cambridge Five and Soviet spy Jürgen Kuczynski lived at Isokon while teaching economics at London University.

Post-war years
The Isokon furniture company ceased trading with the outbreak of World War II, but was restarted in 1963. The British architect Sir James Frazer Stirling was a resident during the early 1960s. In 1969 the building was sold to the New Statesman magazine and the Isobar was converted into flats. In 1972 the building was sold to Camden London Borough Council and gradually deteriorated until the 1990s when it was abandoned and lay derelict for several years.

Rescue and refurbishment
In 2003 the building was sympathetically refurbished by Avanti Architects, a practice which specialises in the refurbishment of Modernist buildings, for the Notting Hill Housing Association who purchased it from Camden London Borough Council. Notting Hill Housing Association remains the freeholder. During the comprehensive restoration, the services were completely renewed, heating and insulation discreetly upgraded and the later overcoat of render removed from the exterior. The building now has a smooth external finish and is the palest tint of pink in colour, like it first was when it opened, and not pure white as is often assumed from back and white historical photos. The building is now partly occupied by key workers under a shared-ownership scheme whilst the larger flats have been sold outright.

Isokon Gallery 
As part of the refurbishment, an exhibition gallery was created in the former garage, run since 2014 wholly by volunteers as a non-profit micro-museum to tell the story of the building, the social and artistic life of its residents and Isokon furniture company. The gallery is open weekends only, 11.00 a.m. to 4.00 p.m. from the beginning of March until the end of October. Flats in the Isokon building are private and cannot be visited, except during Open House in September each year.

Designation
The building was designated a Grade I listed structure in 1999, placing it amongst the most significant historic buildings in England. An English Heritage blue plaque was fixed in 2018 to commemorate the residence of the Bauhaus masters Gropius, Breuer and Moholy-Nagy.

Publications

References

External links

Isokon Gallery
Page on the site from the Open University
Camden listed building information

Jack Pritchard — The Pritchard Papers, University of East Anglia

Isokon Trust (archive), University of East Anglia
Wells Coates site
Avanti Architects project page

1934 establishments in England
1934 in London
Apartment buildings in London
Art Deco architecture in London
Grade I listed buildings in the London Borough of Camden
Grade I listed residential buildings
Houses in Hampstead
Modernist architecture in London
Residential buildings completed in 1934
Restored and conserved buildings
Wells Coates buildings